The 1944 Nobel Prize in Literature was awarded to the Danish author Johannes V. Jensen "for the rare strength and fertility of his poetic imagination with which is combined an intellectual curiosity of wide scope and a bold, freshly creative style." He is the fourth Danish recipient of the literary prize.

Laureate

Jensens early works was in the fin-de-siècle pessimism style. He found his own voice as a writer with Himmerlandshistorier ("Himmerland Stories", 1898–1910), comprising a series of tales set in the part of Denmark where he was born. This was followed by the acclaimed historical novel The Fall of the King (1900-1901) centred on the Danish 16th century King Christian II.  The novel series Den lange rejse ("The Long Journey", 1908–22), spanning the early history of humanity in six volumes with a focus on evolutionary theory, is regarded as Jensens greatest achievement. In addition to these books, Jensen wrote numerous prose works and essays and was also a prominent poet. His Digte ("Poems", 1906) is regarded as the start of modernist poetry in Denmark.

Nominations
Jensen had been nominated for the Nobel Prize in Literature on 53 occasions since 1925. He was nominated every year between 1931 and 1944. In 1942 the Nobel committee received seven nominations for Jensen, followed by two nominations in 1943 and two nominations in 1944. 

In total, the Nobel committee received 24 nominations for 21 individuals including Gabriela Mistral (awarded in 1945), Hermann Hesse (awarded in 1946), Enrique Larreta, Johan Huizinga, Georges Duhamel, John Steinbeck (awarded in 1962) and Paul Valéry. Four were newly nominated namely Abol-Gassem E’tessam Zadeh, Luis Nueda y Santiago, Charles Ferdinand Ramuz and Arnulf Øverland. Maria Madalena de Martel Patrício, Henriette Charasson, Elisaveta Bagryana and Gabriela Mistral were the only women nominated.

The authors George Ade, Joaquín Álvarez Quintero, Marc Bloch, Max Brand, Édouard Bourdet, Joseph Campbell, Jean Cavaillès, Irvin S. Cobb, Olive Custance, Eugénio de Castro, Antoine de Saint-Exupéry, Enrique Díez Canedo, Agnes Mary Frances Duclaux, Edith Durham, Benjamin Fondane, Giovanni Gentile, Henri Ghéon, Jean Giraudoux, Philippe Henriot, Max Jacob, Napoleon Lapathiotis, Stephen Leacock, Elsa Lindberg-Dovlette, Filippo Tommaso Marinetti, Kaj Munk, Robert Nichols, Augusta Peaux, Karel Poláček, Armand Praviel, Arthur Quiller-Couch, Jacques Roumain, Israel Joshua Singer, Ida Tarbell, Florence Trail, Hüseyin Rahmi Gürpınar, Margery Williams, and Harold Bell Wright died in 1944 without having been nominated for the prize.

Notes

Award ceremony
On 10 December 1944 a luncheon was held at the Waldorf-Astoria in New York in place of the customary ceremony in Stockholm. Per Hallström, chairman of the Nobel committee of the Swedish Academy, delivered a lecture on the Nobel Prize laureate in literature that was broadcast the same day. Unable to attend the 1944 award ceremony, Johannes V. Jensen received his prize at Stockholm on 10 December 1945.

At the award ceremony in Stockholm on 10 December 1945 Anders Österling, permanent secretary of the Swedish Academy said:

References

External links
Presentation Lecture by Per Hallström, chairman of the Nobel committee.
Award ceremony speech by Anders Österling.

Nobel Prize in Literature by year
Nobel Prize